Abraeinae is a subfamily of clown beetles in the family Histeridae. There are at least 20 genera and at least 440 described species in Abraeinae.

Many of the groups are tiny, with adults less than 2 mm in length. These beetles are diverse in form with a small oval specie that separates them from all the other histerids expect for the Bacaniini. The Abraeinae lacks of a separate basal piece of the aedeagus.

Genera
 Abaeletes Cooman, 1940
 Abraeus Leach, 1817
 Acritodes Cooman, 1935
 Acritomorphus Wenzel, 1944
 Acritus J. L. LeConte, 1853
 Aeletes Horn, 1873
 Aeletodes Gomy, 1977
 Anophtaeletes Olexa, 1976
 Arizonacritus Gomy & Warner, 2013
 Chaetabraeus Portevin, 1929
 Eubrachium Wollaston, 1862
 Halacritus Schmidt, 1893
 Iberacritus Yélamos, 1994
 Mascarenium Gomy, 1978
 Phloeolister Bickhardt, 1916
 Plegaderus Erichson, 1834
 Pleuroleptus G. Müller, 1937
 Spelaeabraeus Moro, 1957
 Spelaeacritus Jeannel, 1934
 Teretriosoma Horn, 1873
 Teretrius Erichson, 1834
 Therondus Gomy, 1974
 Trypolister Bickhardt, 1916
 Xiphonotus Lacordaire, 1854

References

 Lawrence, J. F., and A. F. Newton Jr. / Pakaluk, James, and Stanislaw Adam Slipinski, eds. (1995). "Families and subfamilies of Coleoptera (with selected genera, notes, references and data on family-group names)". Biology, Phylogeny, and Classification of Coleoptera: Papers Celebrating the 80th Birthday of Roy A. Crowson, vol. 2, 779–1006.
 Mazur, Slawomir (1997). "A world catalogue of the Histeridae (Coleoptera: Histeroidea)". Genus, International Journal of Invertebrate Taxonomy (Supplement), 373.

Further reading

 Arnett, R. H. Jr., M. C. Thomas, P. E. Skelley and J. H. Frank. (eds.). (21 June 2002). American Beetles, Volume II: Polyphaga: Scarabaeoidea through Curculionoidea. CRC Press LLC, Boca Raton, Florida .
 Arnett, Ross H. (2000). American Insects: A Handbook of the Insects of America North of Mexico. CRC Press.
 Richard E. White. (1983). Peterson Field Guides: Beetles. Houghton Mifflin Company.

External links

 NCBI Taxonomy Browser, Abraeinae

Histeridae
Polyphaga subfamilies